Sajitha Madathil is an Indian film and theatre actor. Her performance in Joy Mathew's feature film  Shutter (2012) won her the Kerala State film award for second best actress. 
She is the head of the department of Acting at the K. R. Narayanan National Institute of Visual Science and Arts (KRNNIVSA), an autonomous institute established by the Government of Kerala. She had been the Deputy Secretary of the Sangeet Natak Akademi New Delhi(Academy of Music and Dance, India), an autonomous body under the Ministry of Culture, Government of India. She appeared in the feature films Shutter in 2012, in Adimadhyantham (Beginning, Middle and End) in 2011, and in Shalini Usha Nair's feature film Akam (The Interior) in 2011.

Career 

Sajitha Madathil had been a Deputy Secretary, Sangeet Natak Akademi New Delhi(Academy of Music and Dance, India, an autonomous body under the Ministry of Culture, Government of India) till 2014. She had also worked as the deputy director, Kerala Chalachithra Academy(Academy of Motion Pictures, Kerala State), Documentation Officer/Documentary Producer with Other Media Communications, New Delhi and Producer with Kairali TV, India. She is also a faculty cum theatre expert at National Institute of Integrated learning and management, New Delhi. She has presented papers in seminars on Kerala culture at different academic seminars all over India and abroad. Sajitha holds a Post-graduation in Theatre Arts (M.A. in drama) from Rabindra Bharati University, Kolkata. She has also completed M.Phil. in Theatre Studies at School of Letters, Mahatma Gandhi University, Kottayam, Kerala. She is currently pursuing a Ph.D. from School of Arts and Aesthetics, Jawaharlal Nehru University, New Delhi.

Activism 

Sajitha was introduced into theatre through the street plays (Kala Jatha) of Kerala Sasthra Sahithya Parishad (KSSP) and performances for various women's groups in Kerala, India. KSSP is the renowned social and people's science movement in Kerala which used to propagate its vision and ideas through theatre.

Theatre 

She has been active in the Malayalam (Kerala) theatre and feminist discourse for more than two decades. Sajitha Madathil is one of the founders of Abhinethri (Actress), the first women's theatre group in Kerala, formed to explore the potential and possibilities of women's expressions. Sajitha has been associated with Kerala theatre from 1987. She has been involved in more than 20 productions as an actress, and also directed two solo performances and scripted 3 plays - Matsyaganddhi, Chanki-Chankaran Family Reality Show and Mother's Day. The major plays that featured her are:
1. Muditheyyam(1991) – A solo performance on the experience of a woman who refuses to tie her hair. The play is an adaptation of the short story written by distinguished feminist writer and activist, Professor Sara Joseph.
2. Aashad ki Ek Din (1993) – Malayalam adaptation of the Hindi play by Mohan Rakesh.
3. Radha (1994) – Play by eminent Malayalam playwright G. Sankarapillai. 
4. Bharatavakyam (1994) - Play by eminent Malayalam playwright G. Sankarapillai.
5. Chirakadiyochakal (1995) - The first play of Abhinethri. The lead characters in this play try to question the given womanhood of the mothers of Karna, the legendary character in the epic Mahabharatha. It also throws light in to the prevalent expectation of body language from actresses. Sajitha played the lead role in the three-member group that conceived, scripted, directed and produced this
play.
6. Beauty Parlour (1999) – The play celebrates the human nature to beautify oneself and narrates the pain when beautification becomes essential for survival due to commodification of the body.  This play was first staged at the National Women's Theatre Festival at Thrissur, Kerala, organised by the Kerala Sangeetha Nataka Academy (Kerala Music and Drama Academy). Later it was performed all over Kerala including the Young Feminists Conference of India, held in Hyderabad in 2001.
7. Matsyaganddhi (2002) – Scripted, directed and acted in this solo performance that traces the life situations and challenges of the fisher-women in Kerala. This play was performed in Thiruvananthapuram, Kerala and in Cape Town, South Africa. The script of this play has been published in Indian Literature, the journal of Sahitya Akademi – the National Academy of Letters, India. It is also part of curriculum at different universities in Kerala.
8. Guardians of the Deep (2002) – Acted in this play, whose cast were drawn from the seven continents of the world. The play celebrates the existence, voices and the views of local fisher-people around the world. British director John Martin directed this play that was produced by Theatre for Africa. The Performances were held in Cape Town and Johannesburg during the Earth Summit in Johannesburg.
9. Water Play (2002) – Acted in this play based on an African folk story, which was directed by Nicholas Ellenbogen of Theatre for Africa, and staged in Johannesburg with Zimbabwean actors. The play narrates the importance of water, the life giver.
10. Mathilukal (2008)-Acted in this play by Promod Payyanur produced by Swaralaya, Palghat, Kerala.
11. Spinal Code(2010) Acted in this play directed by Deepan Shivaraman and produced by Oxygen theatre Company.
12.Kali Natakam (2016) Sripted and acted in this play directed by Chandradasan and produced by Lokadharmi,Eranakulam

TV/Video productions 
Sajitha Madathil had worked as a producer in Kairali TV, a Malayalam Satellite Channel, from 2000 to 2002.  During this tenure, she had conceived, co-ordinated and directed 75 episodes of a weekly magazine titled Penmalayalam (Malayali Women) on women's issues and performance tradition.
She received Three state awards for Documentary Making.
For Public Relations Department, Government of Kerala she directed a documentary on P K Medini—Maattathinte pattukari (The Minstrel of Change) in 2011 with duration of 42min.

Publication 
Sajitha has been actively writing on Kerala theater for last few years. She received Kerala Sangeet Natak Akademi Award for Best book of the year for her first book on history of Women in Malayalam Theatre, 2010. 
Aranginte Vakabedangal, (Shaded of Theatre) Kottayam: DC Books, 2012, Malayala Nadaka Sthree Charithram, (Women's theatre history) Kozhikode: Mathrubhumi Publishing House, 2010. M K Kamalam, A Biography Kerala Sangeeta Nataka Academy, 2010. And " Matsyaganddhi" screen play in the Anthology of Screen Plays .New Delhi: Oxford University Press, 2004 are her other published works. Now she is working on a book on women's intervention in three performing art forms of Kerala under the fellowship of Indian Foundation for Arts (IFA). She blogs at http://matsyaganddhi.blogspot.com/

Awards and nominations 

 2013 - Kerala State Film Award for Second Best Actress - "Shutter" 
 Kerala State Sangeet Natak Akademi Award for Best Theatre Book 2010
 Kerala State Television Award for best current affairs programme in 2000
 Best Children's Documentary Award by the Kerala State Council for Child Welfare, in 2000.
 Kerala Film Critics Award for Best Documentary in 2001
 2013 – Asiavision Awards – Best Supporting Actress
 2015-Kanal-Vayala Puraskaram for the contribution to Malayalam Theatre
 2015-Filmfare Awards South- Best Supporting Actress-Nominated (Njaan)
 2019 - Kerala Sangeetha Nataka Akademi Award

Filmography

References

External links 
 http://indulekha.biz/index.php?route=product/author/product&author_id=496
 http://matsyaganddhi.blogspot.in/2010/03/stage-for-thought-sajitha-madathil.html
 https://web.archive.org/web/20130313031836/http://www.mathrubhumi.com/movies/interview/345642#storycontent
 http://www.thehindu.com/features/friday-review/theatre/of-and-by-women/article4462328.ece

Living people
Kerala State Film Award winners
Indian film actresses
Actresses from Kozhikode
Actresses in Malayalam cinema
21st-century Indian actresses
Year of birth missing (living people)
Indian women television producers
Indian television producers
Indian stage actresses
Actresses in Malayalam theatre
Women television producers
Recipients of the Kerala Sangeetha Nataka Akademi Award